Gundeep Kumar (born 15 May 1965) is an Indian field hockey player. He competed in the men's tournament at the 1988 Summer Olympics.

References

External links
 

1965 births
Living people
Indian male field hockey players
Olympic field hockey players of India
Field hockey players at the 1988 Summer Olympics
Place of birth missing (living people)